Stesilea prolata is a species of beetle in the family Cerambycidae. It was described by Francis Polkinghorne Pascoe in 1865. It is known from Moluccas.

Subspecies
 Stesilea prolata prolata Pascoe, 1865
 Stesilea prolata bangkeiensis Breuning, 1958

References

Pteropliini
Beetles described in 1865